J. Arthur Moore (October 17, 1891 – December 20, 1979) was a lumberman, farmer and political figure in New Brunswick, Canada. He represented Queen's County in the Legislative Assembly of New Brunswick from 1925 to 1935, from 1939 to 1944 and from 1952 to 1967.

He was born in Scotchtown, New Brunswick, the son of David Powers and Martha Olmstead. In 1917, he married Maude Mayes. He was defeated in a bid for reelection in 1935. Moore served as speaker for the provincial assembly from 1955 to 1960. He died in 1979.

References 

 ''Canadian Parliamentary Guide, 1956, PG Normandin

1891 births
1979 deaths
Progressive Conservative Party of New Brunswick MLAs
Speakers of the Legislative Assembly of New Brunswick
People from Queens County, New Brunswick